Uyongʉ Yata'uyungana (July 5, 1908 – April 17, 1954), also known as Uong'e Yatauyungana, Yata Issei (矢多一生), Kao Yi-sheng (高一生), was a Taiwanese Tsou musician and educator of the Tfuya tribe. He served as a local officer and a leader of the indigenous autonomous movement in the early post-war Taiwan.

Yatauyungana was educated at Tainan Normal School and became a teacher. In 1945, he served as mayor of Wufeng Township in Chiayi, which was later named Alishan.

During the 228 Incident in 1947, Yatauyungana led a group of Tsou to fight the Kuomintang in Chiayi; when their attempts to take Chiayi Airport were unsuccessful, they returned to Alishan.

In 1952, during the White Terror, he was accused of treason by the government for his advocacy for indigenous autonomy, and was executed along with five other indigenous leaders, including Watan.  He was posthumously exonerated by the Transitional Justice Commission on July 29, 2020.

Family 
  (daughter)
 Avai Yata'uyungana (son)
 Tanivu Yatauyungana (granddaughter)

References 

 

20th-century Taiwanese politicians
1908 births
1954 deaths
People from Chiayi County
Mayors of places in Taiwan
People executed by Taiwan by firearm
20th-century Taiwanese educators
Taiwanese schoolteachers
Tsou people